The 2018 Ladies Open Hechingen was a professional tennis tournament played on outdoor clay courts. It was the twentieth edition of the tournament and was part of the 2018 ITF Women's Circuit. It took place in Hechingen, Germany, on 6–12 August 2018.

Singles main draw entrants

Seeds 

 1 Rankings as of 30 July 2018.

Other entrants 
The following players received a wildcard into the singles main draw:
  Anna Gabric
  Alia Lex
  Lena Rüffer
  Carina Witthöft

The following players received entry from the qualifying draw:
  Varvara Flink
  Tamara Korpatsch
  Jule Niemeier
  Anastasia Zarycká

The following players received entry as a lucky loser:
  Eleni Kordolaimi

Champions

Singles

 Ekaterine Gorgodze def.  Laura Siegemund, 6–2, 6–1

Doubles

 Polina Monova /  Chantal Škamlová def.  Ksenia Palkina /  Sofia Shapatava, 6–4, 6–3

External links 
 2018 Ladies Open Hechingen at ITFtennis.com
 Official website

2018 ITF Women's Circuit
2018 in German tennis
Ladies Open Hechingen
August 2018 sports events in Germany